This is a list of properties and districts in Pierce County, Georgia that are listed on the National Register of Historic Places (NRHP).

Current listings

|}

References

Pierce
Buildings and structures in Pierce County, Georgia
National Register of Historic Places in Pierce County, Georgia